Baju Melayu (Jawi: باجو ملايو) is a traditional Malay costume, originated from the court of Malacca Sultanate and is traditionally worn by men in Brunei, Malaysia, Singapore, parts of Indonesia (especially Sumatra and Kalimantan), southern Philippines, and southern Thailand. It literally translates as Malay dress and consists of two main parts. The first being the baju (long-sleeved shirt) itself which has a raised stiff collar known as the cekak musang collar (literally fox's leash). The second part is the trousers called seluar. The two parts are made out of the same type of fabric which is usually cotton, or a mixture of polyester and cotton. A skirt-type adornment is also commonly worn with the Baju Melayu, which is either the kain samping, made out of songket, tenun cloth or the kain sarung, made out of cotton or a polyester mix. Both are loops of fabric that are folded around the wearer's waist. Jet-black or dark-colored headgear called the songkok can also be worn to complete the attire.

Name
Originally, the term baju kurung was used to refer to both the men's and women's outfits. However, in modern Malaysia, the men's outfit was renamed Baju Melayu as it was chosen to be the national costume of Malaysia. The older definition is still maintained in Singapore.

Styles

Cekak Musang 
In shirts made with the cekak musang collar, the placket of the baju will seem to form a third of the baju from the top when it is worn beneath the kain samping or kain sarung. However, the hemline of the baju actually runs to the middle of the lap. The placket typically has three to five buttonholes and is fastened together by dress studs called kancing or sitat which are not unlike those used in Western-style formal dress shirts. The studs usually have screw-on backs and can be made from a variety of materials including gold, silver, and precious or semi-precious stones. The studs may also be connected with a light metal chain which will be concealed behind the shirt when the placket is fastened.

Teluk Belanga 
In the state of Johor, both the design and the wearing of Baju Melayu is somewhat different from that of other areas. Here, the kain samping or kain sarung is worn below the baju rather than above it. The baju itself does not have the cekak musang collar or any placket. Instead, the opening is hemmed with stiff stitching called tulang belut (literally eel's spine) and ends with a small loop at the top of one side to fit a singular kancing (similar to the collars of Baju Kurung worn by women). This style is known as the Teluk Belanga style and was believed to be designed by Sultan Abu Bakar's aides to commemorate the move of Johor's administrative capital from Teluk Belanga in Singapore to Tanjung Puteri in 1866 (known as Johor Bahru from 1866).

Kolar Tunku 
Kolar Tunku is one of the collars of Baju Melayu. This type of collar is made special for Tunku Abdul Rahman by Omar Ali (Oldest Baju Melayu Brand in the world). It has rounded collar's corner and only 3 buttons below the collar.

Seluar 

The baju is traditionally worn by men with trousers called the seluar. The seluar are traditionally wide at the top, fastened with a running string called tali, and closer at the legs where it extends to below the knees. The styles of seluar include the Acehnese seluar, seluar gadah which reaches to the ankles and seluar pende which terminates at about the middle of the thighs. The seluar panjang are long and are sometimes buttoned at the feet.

Occasions for usage 

A black Baju Melayu with a black Kain Samping embroidered with gold thread is considered a form of formal dress, and is the official attire required during official national events, especially highly formal ones like the official celebration of the Yang di-Pertuan Agong's birthday. Malaysian ambassadors presenting their credentials to foreign heads of state are also required to wear the black Baju Melayu. The white Baju Melayu is worn by Malaysian royalty when mourning the passing away of a member of the royal family.

The Baju Melayu is commonly worn in Malaysia Brunei, Indonesia, Singapore and southern Thailand by Malay men, although its use in Singapore and Thailand is usually restricted to Fridays at mosques, and the Eid ul-Fitr holiday. Bruneian and Malaysian men usually wear the shirt for general religious occasions, such as visiting the mosque or for a religious gathering. In Brunei, it is commonly worn at formal events, such as festivals and weddings. Some companies allow their male workers to wear Baju Melayu on Fridays, whereas others have it as a policy. On the whole Singaporeans frequently refer to it as a Baju Kurung, although this term in Malaysia usually refers only to the corresponding outfit for women.

In Indonesia, both the Baju Melayu in both collar styles (and other Malay clothes such as Baju Kurung) is popular in provinces with large Malay populations such as Riau, the Riau Islands, West Kalimantan and a few other provinces mainly in Sumatera and other places where the presence of ethnic Malays are dominant. Recently, the Baju Melayu has become more popular and is not only worn at traditional events, but also on informal occasions. Government officials in Riau and other places wear them proudly during official events (even national events). It is also worn as a uniform in Silat, a traditional Malay martial arts. The Betawi version of Baju Melayu is called Baju Demang, because Betawi are also part of the big Malay tradition, its customs and attire is similar to the Malay. Other local indigenous Malay ethnics in Indonesia also have their own style of Baju Melayu probably which have the same similarities such as the usage of the Songkok as the headdress for men and kain samping.

The female version of the baju melayu is called the baju kurung.

See also 

 Malaysian cultural outfits
 Culture of Malaysia
 National costume of Indonesia
 Culture of Indonesia

Notes 

Malay culture
Malaysian culture
Malay clothing
Indonesian clothing
History of Asian clothing